J. D. Collins may refer to:
 Judson Dwight Collins, American Methodist missionary to China
 Jarmon Durisseau-Collins, former basketball player